NK Slavonija is a Croatian football club based in the town of Požega in Slavonia.

Honours 

 Treća HNL – East:
Winners (2): 2002–03, 2012–13

Football clubs in Croatia
Football clubs in Požega-Slavonia County
Požega, Croatia